Minuscule 87 (in the Gregory-Aland numbering), CL22 (Soden), is a Greek minuscule manuscript of the New Testament, on parchment leaves. Palaeographically it has been assigned to the 11th century. Formerly it was dated to the 12th century (F. H. A. Scrivener, C. R. Gregory).

Description 

The codex contains the text of the Gospel of John, with a catena, on 231 leaves (size ).
The biblical text is surrounded by a catena.

Kurt Aland the Greek text of the codex did not place in any Category. 

The text of the Pericope Adulterae (John 7:53-8:11) is omitted.

History 

Formerly the manuscript was held in της μονης του προδρομου της κοιμενης εγγιστα της Αετιου αρχαικη δε τη μονη κησις πετρα in Constantinople, as codices 178 and 774.

The manuscript once belonged to the famous scholar, philosopher and mathematician, Cardinal Nicholas of Cusa, together with the manuscript 129. 

It came from Constantinople; it was housed at Trier. It was examined by Balthasar Cordier, and Scholz. 
It was added to the list of the New Testament manuscripts by Scholz. Wettstein's 87 is minuscule 250. C. R. Gregory tried to find this manuscript twice in 1884 in Trier and Cusa, but unsuccessfully.

It is currently housed in at the Cusanusstift (Bd. 18), at Bernkastel-Kues.

See also 

 List of New Testament minuscules
 Biblical manuscript
 Textual criticism

References

Further reading 

 Balthasar Cordier, "Catena patrum Graecorum in s. Joannem ex antiquissimo Graeco codice MS. nunc primum in luce edita" (Antwerp, 1630).
 Bernard de Montfaucon, Bibliotheca Coisliniana olim Segueriana, Paris: Ludovicus Guerin & Carolus Robustel, 1715, p. 110.

Greek New Testament minuscules
11th-century biblical manuscripts